Ilir Rusmali (born 24 April 1965) is a member of the Assembly of the Republic of Albania for the Democratic Party of Albania.

References

1965 births
Living people
Democratic Party of Albania politicians
Members of the Parliament of Albania
21st-century Albanian politicians
Government ministers of Albania
Justice ministers of Albania